The electoral district of Glen Waverley is an electoral district of the Legislative Assembly in the Australian state of Victoria.

It was originally created for the 1985 Victorian state election and was abolished at the 2002 election.

At the 2021 redistribution, it was re-created following the abolition of the districts of Forest Hill and Mount Waverley, covering eastern Melbourne suburbs. 

It contains the suburbs of Glen Waverley, Vermont South, most of Forest Hill and Vermont, and parts of Blackburn South, Burwood East, and Wheelers Hill.

Members

Election results

References

Electoral districts of Victoria (Australia)
1985 establishments in Australia
2002 disestablishments in Australia
2022 establishments in Australia
City of Whitehorse
City of Monash
Glen Waverley, Victoria
Electoral districts and divisions of Greater Melbourne